TV Buddha is a video sculpture by Nam June Paik first produced in 1974. In the work, a Buddha statue watches an image of itself on a TV screen. The screen's image is produced by a live video camera trained on the Buddha statue.

The work was produced to fill a gap in a 1974 exhibition at gallery Bonino, New York. Paik had purchased an 18th-century Buddha statue on Canal street in New York City.

Collections
The work was first purchased for a museum collection in 1977 by the Stedelijk Museum Amsterdam. Paik produced successive versions of the work. A 1976 version of the work is in the collection of the Art Gallery of New South Wales, Australia. A 2004 version is held by the Fogg museum at Harvard University.

References

Video art